LNB may refer to:

Sport 
 Liga Nacional de Baloncesto, a professional basketball league in the Dominican Republic
 Liga Nacional de Básquet, an Argentine basketball league
 Ligue Nationale de Basket, the governing body of men's basketball in France
 Ligue Nationale de Basket (Switzerland), a Swiss professional basketball league

Other uses 
 Laredo National Bank, an American commercial bank
 Level of neutral buoyancy
 Low-noise block downconverter
 Mbalanhu dialect of the Ovambo language
 National Library of Latvia